Stinz is a comic book created by Donna Barr, chronicling the adventures of Steinheld Löwhard, or "Stinz"---a half-horse (centaurs are barbarians) who lives with other centaurs and "two-leggers" in an imaginary Alpine valley called the Gieselthal.

The society of the Gieselthal is very reminiscent of pre-World War I Germany, and the people speak a German dialect invented by Barr herself.  The Gieselthal centaurs call themselves halbpferd ("halfhorses") and look down on the nomadic "gypsy centaurs" who come through their valley at intervals. While relations between centaurs and "two-leggers" are usually cordial, there is normally some distance---centaurs see "two-leggers" as weak and fragile.

Stinz Löwhard is, uniquely among his people, a veteran of the military, having attained the rank of Major, and war-hero status, in the last war fought in his world.  He was greatly changed by his eight years' military service, and often feels rather alienated from his neighbors and family on account of it. Even so, he is a loving, faithful husband and tries to be the best father he knows how to be.  He is quite wealthy, by the standards of his home, and holds the titles of "Räth" (council member) and Mayor at various times.

The Stinz stories cover his life through his mischievous youth, up through his stormy courtship of his neighbor's daughter Brüna, his induction into the military, some of his war exploits, and his life after his return home.

Barr has recently published the 1981 novel in which Stinz (in very different form) first appeared, under the title An Insupportable Light.

Comics publications
Fictional centaurs
Fictional German people
Fantagraphics titles